The Central Coast Mariners FC–Western Sydney Wanderers FC rivalry is a rivalry between NSW clubs Central Coast Mariners and Western Sydney Wanderers.

History of the rivalry

The first meeting between the two teams was an A-League match on 6 October 2012, for the Western Sydney Wanderers' first competitive match. The result was a 0–0 draw in front of more than 10,000 spectators at Parramatta Stadium.

The rivalry begun to form between the two teams in April 2013, when the 2013 A-League Grand Final was played on Wanderers' home soil. Central Coast finished the game with a 2–0 victory earn themselves their first A-League Championship title.

On 28 January 2023, the two clubs contested a highly-anticipated league fixture, as the Mariners sat second on the A-League table and the Wanderers sat third, only two points behind. The match was marred by a moment of aggression from the Wanderers active support bay towards the Central Coast Mariners fans sitting in General Admission, following an equalizer from Yeni Ngbakoto after Sam Silvera had opened the scoring for the Mariners 5 minutes prior. Wanderers fans were widely condemned for "charging at families" in celebration, with video footage captured and posted on Twitter of them jumping over the tarping that separated them from the Mariners fans and storming their bay. The match ended in a 2-2 draw.

Results

Full list of competitive matches involving Central Coast Mariners FC and Western Sydney Wanderers FC:

Fixture top scorers in the rivalry

Statistics and records
As of 5 March 2023, there have been 33 competitive meetings between the two teams, of which Central Coast have won 8 and Western Sydney 15. The biggest winning margin was a 4–1 home win on 1 April 2016 and a 4–1 away win on 3 December 2016 both for Western Sydney and a 3–0 away win on 5 November 2022 for Central Coast.

Summary of results
As of 5 March 2023.

Crossing the divide
23 players have played for both Central Coast and Western Sydney since 2012. The first player to have played for both clubs, however, predated the start of the rivalry; Michael Beauchamp joined Central Coast in 2005 and Western Sydney upon their admission to the A-League in 2012. Ruon Tongyik is the only player to have played for both clubs to have returned to his original club afterwards, returning to Western Sydney in 2022 after his stint with Central Coast. Statistics are sourced from ALeagueStats.com and updated as of 8 February 2023.

Central Coast, then Western Sydney

Western Sydney, then Central Coast

Clubs' honours
As of 5 March 2023, these are the football honours of Central Coast Mariners and Western Sydney Wanderers:

Highest attendances
 Western Sydney 0–2 Central Coast; 42,102 (21 April 2013); Sydney Football Stadium (Western Sydney home)
 Western Sydney 2–0 Central Coast; 19,216 (26 April 2014); Parramatta Stadium (Western Sydney home)
 Central Coast 0–1 Western Sydney; 18,721 (2 March 2013); Central Coast Stadium (Central Coast home)
 Central Coast 1–1 Western Sydney; 17,134 (12 October 2013); Central Coast Stadium (Central Coast home)
 Western Sydney 2–1 Central Coast; 17,091 (12 October 2019); Western Sydney Stadium (Western Sydney home)
 Western Sydney 0–2 Central Coast; 16,387 (6 January 2013); Parramatta Stadium (Western Sydney home)
 Western Sydney 2–0 Central Coast; 15,786 (23 December 2013); Parramatta Stadium (Western Sydney home)
 Western Sydney 4–1 Central Coast; 14,855 (1 April 2016); Parramatta Stadium (Western Sydney home)
 Western Sydney 0–0 Central Coast; 14,691 (19 November 2014); Parramatta Stadium (Western Sydney home)
 Western Sydney 0–0 Central Coast; 14,137 (1 January 2015); Parramatta Stadium (Western Sydney home)

References

Australian soccer rivalries
Central Coast Mariners FC
Soccer in New South Wales
Western Sydney Wanderers FC